Eastern Orthodoxy in Syria represents Christians in Syria who are adherents of the Eastern Orthodox Church. The Eastern Orthodox and 'Greek' Catholic tradition is represented in Syria by two distinct albeit historically and culturally related Byzantine communities: the Greek Orthodox Church of Antioch, the largest and oldest Christian community in the country, closely followed by the Melkite Greek Catholic Church, itself a Uniate offshoot of the Greek Orthodox Church of Antioch.

Dual self-designation: "Melkites" and "Eastern Romans" 
Members of these communities in Syria and the Hatay province of Turkey (formerly part of Northern Syria), still call themselves Rūm which means "Eastern Romans" or "Asian Greeks" in Arabic, both referring to the Byzantine inheritance, and indeed they follow its central Greek-language version of the Constantinian or Byzantine Rite.

In that particular context, the term "Rūm" is used in preference to "Yūnāniyyūn" which means "European Greeks" or Ionians Classical Arabic.

Members of these communities also call themselves "Melkites", which literally means "monarchists" or "supporters of the emperor" in Semitic languages (a reference to their ancient allegiance to Macedonian and Roman imperial rule), but, in the modern era, the term tends to be more commonly used by followers of the Greek Catholic Church of Antioch.

Presence in neighboring countries
These churches also exist in other parts of the Middle-East, notably Southern Turkey, Lebanon and Northern Israel and some Greek Orthodox intellectuals have been noted in the past for their secularist "pan-Arab" or "pan-Syrian" leanings, notably during the colonial and post-colonial eras. The Greek Orthodox Christians also have a long and continuous association with Orthodox Christian European nations such as Greece, Cyprus, Russia, Ukraine, Bulgaria, Serbia and Romania.

Notable Orthodox Christians in Syria 
 Michel Aflak - Philosopher, founder of the secularist Baath party
 Dawoud Rajiha - Minister of Defense from 2011 to 2012
Qustaki al-Himsi - Writer and poet of the Nahda movement 
Abd al-Masih Haddad - Writer of the Mahjar movement and journalist

 Constantin Zureiq - Longtime history professor at the American University of Beirut and proponent of secular Arab nationalism
 Halim Barakat - Arab novelist and sociologist
George Wassouf - One of the most successful Arab singers selling over 60 million records worldwide
Nassif Zeytoun - Singer and the 2010 winner of the Arabic reality television show Star Academy
Nasib Arida - Poet and writer of the Mahjar movement and a founding member of the New York Pen League.
 Ignatius IV of Antioch - Patriarch of the Greek Orthodox Church of Antioch and All The East from 1979 to 2012
 John X of Antioch - Primate of the Greek Orthodox Patriarchate of Antioch and All The East
 Jules Jammal - Military officer and martyr
 Joseph Sweid - Minister of State since 2011 and a member of the Syrian Social Nationalist Party
 Mary Ajami - Feminist and pioneering Arabic-language writer

Cities, towns and villages with a Greek Orthodox Christian majority or large minority in Syria 
Mhardeh, Al-Suqaylabiyah, Kafr Buhum, Safita, Wadi al-Nasara, Al-Kafrun, Mashta al-Helu, Maten al-Sahel, Marmarita, Hawash, Rabah, Syria, Kafr Ram, Deir Mama, Al-Bayda, Syria, Ma'loula, Saidnaya, Al-Suwayda, Salkhad, Zweitina, Ayn al-Barda, Muklous, Uyun al-Wadi , Tissya , Al Usloha , Hab Nemra , Mothbeen

See also 

 Arab Orthodox
 Antiochian Greek Christians
 Greek Orthodox Church of Antioch
 Religion in Syria
 Christianity in Syria
 Roman Catholicism in Syria
 Demographics of Syria
 Freedom of religion in Syria
 Lebanese Greek Orthodox Christians
 Eastern Orthodoxy in Jordan
 University of Balamand

Notes

References

Sources